Manitoba Justice, or the Department of Justice (formerly the Department of the Attorney General), is the provincial government department responsible for administering the Crown Law justice systems in the province of Manitoba.

More specifically, Manitoba Justice deals with the provision of correctional services; the protection of personal and property rights; the drafting of legislation; provision of civil and criminal court services; the provision of civil legal services to government; and development of law reform. Within these areas of concern, Manitoba Justice looks over the Law Enforcement Review Agency (LERA), the Office of the Chief Medical Examiner, and the Public Guardian and Trustee, among others. Manitoba Justice also provides funding to several independent bodies, including the Law Reform Commission, Legal Aid Manitoba, and Manitoba Human Rights Commission.

Established in 1871, the Department of the Attorney General was one of the first departments formed by the newly-established Province of Manitoba—however, the initial legislation related to the Department, the Attorney General's Act, would not be passed until 1885.

The department is overseen by a cabinet minister known as the Minister of Justice and Attorney General, currently Kelvin Goertzen. The minister who holds this office is typically also designated as Keeper of the Great Seal of the Province of Manitoba.

History and legislation 
Authority for administering justice within each province and territory of Canada was assigned to provincial governments by section 92(14) of the federal Constitution Act, 1867. Manitoba's justice arm, the Department of the Attorney General, was formed in 1871, becoming one of the first departments formed by the newly-established province. However, the initial legislation related to the Department, the Attorney General's Act, would not be passed until 1885.

Designating authority to the Department, the 1885 Attorney General's Act would be renamed to the Department of Justice Act in 1987. Accordingly, the Department was reorganized in 1989 and—hoping to reflect its broadened influence in provincial government and justice system—became the Department of Justice.

In 1997, the responsibilities of Manitoba Justice were expanded to include administration of the Justice Initiatives Fund (formerly the Aboriginal Justice Fund), a program designed to fund initiatives that support the Department's goals. In 2016, the department took responsibility over crime prevention (transferred from the Children and Youth Opportunities department) and consumer protection (transferred from the Department of Tourism, Culture, Heritage, Sport and Consumer Protection).

Statutes 
In Manitoba, an Act (or statute) is a law enacted by the Legislative Assembly of Manitoba. A consolidated Act is one that has been updated to incorporate amendments into its original text, with continuing application as amended. Moreover, in Manitoba, consolidated Acts are grouped into three subcategories:

 The Continuing Consolidation of the Statutes of Manitoba (C.C.S.M.) is a set of Manitoba public Acts that have a general, rather than particular, application.
 Municipal Acts are public Acts that are applicable to particular municipalities.
 Private Acts are those that have no general application. Instead, they confer "special rights or exemptions on specific individuals or groups."

On behalf of the province, Manitoba's Department of Justice administers and enforces more than 100 provincial statutes relating to civil law, correctional services, and court administration, among others. Consolidated Acts that Manitoba Justice has been responsible for include, among others, The Human Rights Code (1987–88); The Liquor, Gaming and Cannabis Control Act (2013), formerly The Liquor Control Act; The Child Custody Enforcement Act (1987); The Justice for Victims of Child Pornography Act (2011); The Manitoba Public Insurance Corporation Act; and The Victims' Bill of Rights (1998), formerly The Victims' Rights Act.

Under the Canadian Constitution Act of 1867, Manitoba Justice is also responsible for such federal legislation as the Criminal Code and the Youth Criminal Justice Act.

Courts Division 
The Courts Division of the Department facilitates court services throughout Manitoba and is overseen by Assistant Deputy Minister Suzanne Gervais. The three courts of Manitoba are:

 Manitoba Court of Appeal; 
 the Court of Queen's Bench of Manitoba; and
 the Provincial Court of Manitoba

Criminal Justice Division 
The Criminal Justice Division provides police protection for all parts of Manitoba, working closely with municipal and Indigenous police as well as the RCMP.

Law Enforcement Review Agency 

The Law Enforcement Review Agency (LERA) is an arm's-length, non-police body of the Criminal Justice Division that, under the authority of The Law Enforcement Review Act (TLERA), investigates public complaints against members of local/municipal police forces in Manitoba—particularly, abuses of authority by on-duty officers. LERA is located in Winnipeg and its current staff consists of the Commissioner, a registrar/administrative officer, a clerk, and 4 investigators.

The Commissioner reports operationally to the Minister of Justice via annual report, as a legislative requirement, and administratively to the Assistant Deputy Minister of Criminal Justice. As of 2020, LERA has statutory jurisdiction over (approx.) 1,664 peace officers that are employed by municipal police departments in Manitoba

Originally, the responsibility of dealing with citizen complaints in Manitoba was handled by local police commissions, composed of some or all members of their respective municipal councils. However, Manitoba Police Commission (MPC)—which was established to provide consultation to municipal police and oversee their operations—would every so often receive complaints that had been inadequately addressed at the local level, and would have to get involved. In 1979, following MPC's investigation of an incident from 1976 that involved the (alleged) beating of a rape suspect by Winnipeg police officers, the Commission recommended a change in public complaint procedures. In March 1981, the Department of the Attorney General proposed for new legislation and, in November 1982, The Law Enforcement Review Act (Bill 2, 32nd Legislature) was introduced into the House. The Bill would pass in August 1983 and would be proclaimed in December 1984. This new law would require that all public complaints regarding the actions of an on-duty police officer be referred to the Commissioner who accesses it according to the Act.

LERA would finally begin operations as an agency on 1 February 1985. In 1988, the Attorney General initiated an evaluation of LERA and the consideration of consolidating LERA and MPC into a single agency dealing with police complaints in order to make use of available resources. In 1992, TLERA was amended, which included the establishment of the Law Enforcement Review Board (LERB); the MPC being dissolved; requiring the burden of proof; and more authority to the Commissioner to resolve complaints.

Crown Law Division 
Civil Justice (or Crown Law), overseen by Assistant Deputy AG Mike Mahon, is the division of Manitoba Justice that consists of the following branches and agencies:

 Civil Legal Services are the internal law firm to the Government of Manitoba, providing legal services to all provincial government entities that do not have legal counsel of their own.
 The Family Law branch is tasked with providing government departments with legal services and advice regarding family law. They help government develop family law policy, programs and legislative initiatives. They also work to increase awareness of family law initiatives and issues among the general public and the legal profession.
 Family Law Manitoba, or the Family Justice Resource Centre, is a service that directs people to relevant services regarding matters of family law, as well as providing other, crucial information.
 The Constitutional Law branch is there to provides the provincial government with legal services regarding constitutional matters. This branch was formed as the Department began to expand its responsibilities, addressing issues related to the interpretation of the Canadian Charter of Rights and Freedoms, which was enacted in 1982.
 The Office of the Chief Medical Examiner is there for situations that involve risk to human life. The Chief Medical Examiner (CME) of Manitoba investigates all "unexpected, unexplained, suspicious, violent and children's deaths" in the province.
 The Manitoba Human Rights Commission (MHRC) is an independent Manitoba agency that operates under Manitoba's Human Rights Code, working towards reducing "unreasonable discrimination" for Manitobans.
 The Manitoba Law Reform Commission
 Legal Aid Manitoba

Legal Aid Manitoba 
{{Infobox government agency
| name = Legal Aid Manitoba
| native_name = 
| seal = 
| logo = 
| formed = 1971
| jurisdiction = 
| employees = 
| budget = $37 m CAD (2019/20)
| chief1_name = Allan Fineblit
| chief1_position = Management Council Chair
| chief2_name = Irene Hamilton
| chief2_position = Advisory Committee Chair
| chief3_name = 
| chief3_position = 
| chief4_name = 
| chief4_position = 
| chief5_name = 
| chief5_position = 
| chief6_name = 
| chief6_position = 
| chief7_name = 
| chief7_position = 
| chief8_name = 
| chief8_position = 
| chief9_name = 
| chief9_position = 
| parent_department = Manitoba Justice
| keydocument1 = The Legal Aid Manitoba Act
| website = 
}}
Legal Aid Manitoba (LAM) is an independent agency, established by The Legal Aid Manitoba Act, that provides legal services in Manitoba to those who may require legal aid.

LAM receives funding from the Province of Manitoba, Government of Canada, and Manitoba Law Foundation, as well as client fees. Legal Aid Manitoba currently has offices in Winnipeg, Brandon, Dauphin, The Pas, and Thompson, with its personnel (including contracted private lawyers) regularly travelling to over 40 rural and northern communities. Approximately 190 provincial employees work with LAM, formally or informally, serving (approx.) 90,000 Manitobans per year.

For cases that affect groups of people (e.g., those involving human rights, environmental law, consumer law, poverty law), LAM funds and oversees its provision of services through the Public Interest Law Centre (PILC). PILC receives additional funding support from the Manitoba Law Foundation, as well as pro bono public interest legal services, in-kind services, client contributions, and occasional project grants.

In the 1930s–40s, the Law Society of Manitoba established the first program in Canada to provide free aid for those who could not afford legal counsel. Lawyers would work pro bono. In 1969, with growing demand for free legal aid, a roster of private bar lawyers were paid $50 daily to act as duty counsel at criminal intake court. In 1971–72, Manitoba would finally incorporate legal aid into provincial legislation in 1971 and, in 1972, Legal Aid Services Society of Manitoba would begin operations. A decade later, with the advent of the Canadian Charter of Rights and Freedoms in 1982, LAM would establish the Public Interest Law Centre to handle cases of social significance, i.e. cases that affect groups/Manitobans broadly.

In 2005, the organization formally changed its name to "Legal Aid Manitoba," and its board of directors was replaced by a management council with a chair and vice-chair appointed by the Lieutenant Governor in Council.

 Manitoba Law Reform Commission 
The Manitoba Law Reform Commission (MLRC) is an arm's-length agency, established in 1970 by The Law Reform Commission Act, that reviews and recommends reforms regarding "modernizing and improving provincial laws."

Consisting of 5 to 7 members appointed by the Lieutenant Governor in Council, the Commission's membership is required to include a judge of the Court of Queen's Bench; a full-time student of the UManitoba Faculty of Law; "a lawyer entitled to practise in Manitoba and not in the employ of the government; and a non-lawyer." One of the members is appointed President of the Commission, and must be a lawyer.

 Community Safety Division 
The largest division of Manitoba Justice is the Community Safety Division, which "administers sentences imposed by the courts on offenders who are in custody or on probation." The Division was overseen by Associate Deputy Minister Scott Kolody during the 2019/20 fiscal year.

This Division provides various services through its branches/units:

Corrections, as well as probation services and conditional sentences—i.e., supervising those in the community who are on probation, bail, or "otherwise following court orders."
Manitoba Corrections consists of 6 adult and 2 youth correctional facilities throughout Manitoba.
Provincial policing, with the responsibility of facilitating the provision of police services throughout the province
The Community Notification Advisory Committee (CNAC) is an advisory body that, after reviewing each case, advises police on whether the public should be notified about those living in the community who are convicted sexual offenders labelled as high-risk of re-offending. As a joint initiative with Brandon Police Service, Correctional Services of Canada, RCMP, and Winnipeg Police Service, this program is the first of its kind in all of Canada.
The Manitoba Police Commission
Protective services, which provide security services and other governmental oversight
The Independent Investigation Unit, which began operations on 19 June 2015 under of Part VII of The Police Services Act, is responsible for conducting investigations when an officer has been involved in an incident where someone has died or suffered a serious injury, or when there is evidence that an officer has violated prescribed legislation.

Relevant legislation includes The Safer Communities and Neighbourhoods Act, The Body Armour and Fortified Vehicle Control Act, and The Parental Responsibility Act.

The Division also oversees the Vehicle Impoundment Registry (VIR), the administrative centre that—under the Highway Traffic Act—administers the seizures and impoundments of vehicles, which includes recording the status of every vehicle seized in Manitoba.

 Manitoba Police Commission 
The Manitoba Police Commission (MPC) provides advice to the Justice Minister on regulations that deal with police operations and conduct. The current Commission was established on 15 November 2010, as per section 6 of Manitoba's Police Services Act,Police Services Act. and is also a member of the Manitoba Association of Chiefs of Police, the Canadian Association of Police Governance, and the Canadian Association of Civilian Oversight of Law Enforcement.

The Commission is currently chaired by David Asper.

All police boards and commissions in Manitoba are required by law to submit an annual report to the MRC. There are 10 municipal police boards and 1 First Nation police commission in Manitoba:

 Altona Police Board (Altona Police Service)
 Brandon Police Board (Brandon Police Service)
 Cornwallis Police Board (Cornwallis Police Service)
 Dakota Ojibway Tribal Council Police Commission (Manitoba First Nation Police Service)
 Morden Police Board (Morden Police Service)
 Riverdale Police Board (Rivers Police Service)
 Springfield Police Board (Springfield Police Service)
 Ste. Anne Police Board (Ste. Anne Police Service)
 Victoria Beach Police Board (Victoria Beach Police Service)
 Winkler Police Board (Winkler Police Service)
 Winnipeg Police Board (Winnipeg Police Service)

 Manitoba Corrections 
Manitoba Corrections (or the Corrections Division) has its head office located on 810 - 405 Broadway in Winnipeg. It includes 6 adult correctional services; 2 youth correctional services, which provide custody and various programs for young people charged with offences and/or sentenced to custody under the federal Youth Criminal Justice Act''; and 27 community corrections offices (incl. 11 in First Nations communities), which provide all "non-custody, community-based offender services and programs."

Minister and Attorney General 

The Minister of Justice and Attorney General is a cabinet minister in the Government of Manitoba. The minister who holds this office is typically also designated as Keeper of the Great Seal of the Province of Manitoba. The current Minister of Justice and Attorney General is Cameron Friesen.

The role of Minister of Justice did not exist in Manitoba prior to 1990, when the designation of Attorney General (AG) was changed to 'Minister of Justice and Attorney General' midway through then-AG James McCrae's time in office. Thereafter, as of September 1990, Manitoba's Minister of Justice has been ex officio the Attorney General for Manitoba.

1871–1990

1990–present

See also
Crime and justice in Manitoba

 Aboriginal Justice Implementation Commission
 Court of Queen's Bench of Manitoba
 Independent Investigation Unit
 Law, government, and crime in Winnipeg
 Winnipeg Police Service
 Manitoba Court of Appeal
 Manitoba Human Rights Commission
 Manitoba Law School
 Manitoba Queen's Printer
 Provincial Court of Manitoba
 RCMP "D" Division

Crime and justice in Canada

 Department of Justice (Canada)
Correctional Service of Canada
Regional Reception Centre
 Crime in Canada
 List of Canadian provinces and territories by homicide rate
 Royal Canadian Mounted Police
 Civilian Review and Complaints Commission for the RCMP

References

Notes

Citations

External links 

 
Manitoba Laws
 Manitoba Courts

Justice, Manitoba
Justice ministries
 
Manitoba